Simone Esposito (born 24 May 1990 in Turin) is an Italian professional football player who currently plays for G.S.D. Lascaris.

Career

Juventus
Simone Esposito began his youth career with Juventus in 2002, and remained within the club's youth program until 2008. He began to earn first team call-ups by former coaches Claudio Ranieri in 2008 and again by Ciro Ferrara in 2009. Esposito made his first team debut on 10 December 2008 in a 2008–09 UEFA Champions League game against FC BATE Borisov. He also played one game in the Coppa Italia.  In the summer of 2010, the attacking midfielder officially graduated the youth team, and was promoted into the senior squad. Following his installment, he was instantly loaned out to Serie B side, Ascoli Calcio, as part of a player exchange, that also was used in attempt to gain regular playing time. Esposito is one of many Juventus loaners, flooding Italian Serie B and Serie C football.

Club statistics

References

External links
 
 

1990 births
Living people
Italian footballers
Italy youth international footballers
Juventus F.C. players
Ascoli Calcio 1898 F.C. players
A.C. Reggiana 1919 players
F.C. Grosseto S.S.D. players
Association football forwards
Pinerolo F.C. players